Sing a Song is the second studio album by American singer Phyllis Hyman, her second release off Buddah Records, in 1978. Shortly after its release, Buddah Records became defunct and sold off to Arista Records, who signed Hyman to the label in late 1978. Many of the songs on this album were later included in her third album, Somewhere in My Lifetime, later in 1978

Background
In 1977 Buddah Records released Hyman's self-titled debut LP, which featured the singles "Loving You, Losing You" and "I Don't Wanna Lose You". A year later Hyman was signed to Arista Records. Her premiere album for the label Somewhere in My Lifetime, was released in 1978. Somewhere in My Lifetime included several tracks that Phyllis had recorded for a 2nd album at Buddah titled Sing A Song.

Track listing
Side One:
 "Living Inside Your Love" (Skip Scarborough, Renee Taylor) - 6:14
 "Sweet Music"  (Al Martinez) - 3:51
 "The Answer Is You" (Mark Radice) - 5:04
 "Love Is Free" (Mark Radice) - 3:49
Side Two:
 "Sing a Song" (Philip Bailey, Ernest Straughter) - 3:39
 "Gonna Make Changes" (Phyllis Hyman) - 3:54
 "Soon Come Again" (Larry Alexander, Sandy Torano) - 3:27
 "Be Careful (How You Treat My Love)" (Garry Glenn) - 4:19
 "Here's That Rainy Day" (Jimmy Van Heusen, Johnny Burke) - 3:02

References

External links
 

1978 albums
Buddah Records albums
Phyllis Hyman albums
Pop albums by American artists